Colton Welker (born October 9, 1997) is an American professional baseball third baseman in the San Francisco Giants organization. Welker was drafted by the Colorado Rockies in the fourth round of the 2016 MLB draft. He made his major league debut in 2021 with the Rockies.

Professional career

Colorado Rockies
Welker was drafted by the Colorado Rockies in the fourth round of the 2016 MLB draft out of Stoneman Douglas High School (where he played shortstop and batted over .500 as a senior) in Parkland, Florida. He signed with Colorado for $855,000, foregoing his commitment to the University of Miami.

Welker spent the 2016 season playing third base with the rookie league Grand Junction Rockies, where he was named both a Pioneer League mid-season All-Star and a Rockies organizational All-Star at the end of the season after batting .329/.366/.491 with five home runs and 36 runs batted in during 51 games. He spent 2017 with the Class A Asheville Tourists where batted .350 (second in the South Atlantic League)/.401(3rd)/.500(9th) with six home runs, 33 runs batted ins, and leading the league with three intentional walks in only 67 games due to injury. 

In 2018, he played with the Class A+ Lancaster JetHawks where he slashed .333 (third in the league)/.383/.489 with 74 runs (7th in the league), 32 doubles (8th), 13 home runs, 82 runs batted in (4th), and two intentional walks (2nd), while grounding into 14 double plays (5th) and leading the league with 11 sacrifice flies in 114 games. He was named a California League mid-season All-Star along with earning a post-season All-Star selection.

Welker spent 2019 with the Class AA Hartford Yard Goats, hitting .252/.313/.408 with 10 home runs, 53 runs batted in, and 6 sacrifice flies (2nd in the Eastern League over 98 games. He did not play a minor league game in 2020 since the season was cancelled due to the COVID-19 pandemic. On November 20, 2020, Welker was added to the 40-man roster. On May 6, 2021, Welker was suspended 80 games after testing positive for chlorodehydromethyltestosterone. Playing for three minor league teams in 2021 he batted .258/.345/.483 in 120 at bats.

On September 8, 2021, Welker made his major league debut against the San Francisco Giants, flying out in his only at bat. He batted .189 for Rockies for the season in 37 at bats. 

In 2022, he began the season playing for the Triple-A Albuquerque Isotopes, batting .324/.422/.514 in 37 at bats.  On June 3, 2022, it was announced that Welker would undergo season-ending surgery to treat a shoulder injury. He was designated for assignment on July 6, 2022. In his career he had played primarily third base (299 games), with 54 games at first base.

San Francisco Giants
Welker was claimed off waivers by the San Francisco Giants on July 8, 2022. He resigned a minor league deal on November 28, 2022.

References

External links

1997 births
Living people
Albuquerque Isotopes players
American sportspeople in doping cases
Arizona Complex League Rockies players
Asheville Tourists players
Baseball players from Florida
Colorado Rockies players
Grand Junction Rockies players
Hartford Yard Goats players
Lancaster JetHawks players
Major League Baseball third basemen
Salt River Rafters players
Spokane Indians players
Sportspeople from Coral Springs, Florida